The Karabinek-granatnik wzór 1960, also designated PMK-DGN-60 or PMK-60, is a Polish-made version of the AK-47 assault rifle that can fire rifle grenades.

Description
The LON-I grenade launcher is screwed onto the forward end of the rifle barrel and locked into place by means of a spring-loaded plunger mounted in the front sight base of a modified AK-47 rifle. The sight for the launcher is mounted on the rear sight base. A valve is fitted to the right side of the gas block, allowing the gas to be shut off (preventing it from leaving the barrel via the gas port) when the grenades are fired.

When using the rifle to launch grenades, a special rubber recoil pad is used and a special 10-round magazine is inserted. This magazine has a filler block that prevents it from being used with "normal" (i.e. bulleted) cartridges. There is also a regular version of this rifle as well that was not designed to shoot grenades.

Operators

 : Limited use by Palestine Liberation Organization (PLO) guerrilla factions in Lebanon.
 : Limited use now, mostly being replaced by the wz. 83 Pallad.
 
 
 : Used during the Vietnam War by the Vietcong and NVA.

See also
AK-47
AKM
Kbk wz. 1988 Tantal
Kbs wz. 1996 Beryl
List of assault rifles

Notes

References
 Gordon L. Rottman and Ron Volstad, Warsaw Pact Ground Forces, Elite series 10, Osprey Publishing Ltd, London 1987. 
 Samuel M. Katz, Lee E. Russel, and Ron Volstad, Armies in Lebanon 1982-84, Men-at-arms series 165, Osprey Publishing Ltd, London 1985.

Secondary sources
Gordon L. Rottman, The AK-47 Kalashnikov-series assault rifles, Weapon series 8, Osprey Publishing Ltd, Oxford 2011. 

7.62×39mm assault rifles
Rifles of the Cold War
Infantry weapons of the Cold War
Grenade launchers of Poland
Kalashnikov derivatives
Assault rifles of Poland
Military equipment introduced in the 1960s